"Anges" (lit. Angel in French) is the first mini-album of the Japanese Singer Shunichi Miyamoto under Victor Entertainment. It was released on December 12, 2003. It includes the live versions of the song, Byakuya ~True Light~ and Caged Bird.

Track listing

CD 
 The Way To Myself
 Run Deeper!
 帰るべき場所 - (Kaerubeki Basho)
 そばにいられるなら - (Soba Ni Irareru Nara; If I Can Stay Close To You (Close To You))
 Never, So Far Away
 Anges
 そばにいられるなら（Starlight Version） - (Soba Ni Irareru Nara (Starlight Version); If I Can Stay Close To You (Close To You (Starlight Version))
 Caged Bird（Live Version）
 白夜～True Light～（Live Version） - (Byakuya ~True Light~ (Live Version); White Night ~True Light~ (Live Version))

Chart performance

Charts

References 

2003 albums